Newstopia (stylised as NEWStopiä) was an Australian half-hour satirical comedy programme hosted by Shaun Micallef. A second season began on 27 February 2008 and concluded on 30 April 2008. A third season of the show screened from 1 October to 3 December 2008. The show was developed by Micallef, Gary McCaffrie, Michael Ward and Jason Stephens, with McCaffrie and Ward working as writers on the programme. A fourth series in 2009 was planned, but cancelled due to production clashes with Talkin' 'Bout Your Generation.

The show's contributors include Matt Cameron, Doug MacLeod, Dave O'Neil, Tony Moclair and Richard Marsland.

Format

The show was presented in the style of a news bulletin, with Shaun Micallef acting as anchor. It began with a statement by Micallef about history and/or news and its relation to the show. The rest of the program featured segments often detailing factual events, but told from a humorous or satirical angle. Like much of Micallef's earlier work, the humour depicted was mostly surreal, with some social satire.

The program included several fictional advertisements placed throughout the real commercial breaks, dressed up to appear as authentic commercials for SBS programs, for example, Inspektor Herring, a parody of Inspector Rex. Because the commercials were fictional creations of Newstopia, for the first two seasons, SBS broadcast them with the SBS watermark at the bottom right corner, whereas genuine commercials did not show the watermark.  Starting in the third season, the show removed the SBS watermark during the fictional advertisements.

The show also featured subliminal parodies of Pope Benedict XVI in which his image was replaced with one of Nosferatu, long enough to be noticed, but not long enough for the viewer to have a clear idea of what they had just seen.

Cast

Regular cast
 Shaun Micallef
 Ben Anderson
 Nicholas Bell
 Julie Eckersley
 Miyuki Watanabe
 Peter Houghton
 Kat Stewart
 Imat Akelo-Opio

Special guests
 Ed Kavalee
 Roz Hammond
 Les Murray
 Bob Franklin
 Daina Reid
 Lee Lin Chin
 Francis Greenslade
 Barry Jones
 Tony Martin
 Anton Enus
 Chris Taylor
 Andrew Hansen

Internet streaming
Following the conclusion of each episode's initial broadcast, the Newstopia website featured a web stream of the current week's episode. This was only available for 7 days, and only to Australian residents, after which it was taken down and replaced by the latest broadcast. International visitors were blocked by an IP blocker. A guestbook was also available for commenting on the newest episode.

See also
 CNNNN The Daily Show Rick Mercer Report This Hour Has 22 Minutes The Beaverton (TV series) Hot Seat
 Real Time with Bill Maher''

References

External links
 Newstopia SBS TV program Website (Not accessible everywhere; see SBS TV official "Program Sites" for link)
 

Australian comedy television series
Special Broadcasting Service original programming
2007 Australian television series debuts
2008 Australian television series endings
Australian satirical television shows
News parodies
Television series by Fremantle (company)
Television shows set in Melbourne